Al-Maradha and Was'a is a sub-district located in Al Ashah District, 'Amran Governorate, Yemen. Al-Maradha and Was'a had a population of 9105 according to the 2004 census.

References 

Sub-districts in Al Ashah District